Thomas Chambers was a Scottish international association footballer. He was awarded one cap for the Scotland national football team in 1894, but he was never selected again despite scoring on his début.

International goals

External links

London Hearts profile

Year of birth missing
Year of death missing
Place of birth missing
Place of death missing
Scottish footballers
Scotland international footballers
Association football inside forwards
Burnley F.C. players
Heart of Midlothian F.C. players
English Football League players
Scottish Football League players
St Bernard's F.C. players